"Song #3" is a single by American rock band Stone Sour, off of their studio album Hydrograd. It topped the US Billboard Mainstream Rock Songs chart in June 2017, where it held the top spot for five consecutive weeks.

Background 
On April 27, 2017, upon the announcement of Stone Sour's sixth studio album, Hydrograd, the band released two singles concurrently; "Fabuless" and "Song #3". The initial release was through streaming, and as an instant grat download when pre-ordering the album. The song was also released to radio, where it topped the US Billboard Mainstream Rock Songs chart. On June 7, 2017, frontman Corey Taylor performed the song solo with only an acoustic guitar on Japanese television show Sukkiri!.

Themes and composition 
Loudwire described the song as a "melodic rocker with huge hooks". The verses have Corey Taylor softly singing over somber, gloomy guitar chords, until the song erupts into a more intense and hopeful sounding chorus, with more layers of melodic guitar and a sing-song melody. Journalists noted that the song was a more melodic, accessible song compared to the band's other initial single from Hydrograd – "Fabuless". Billboard described the song as an "...emotive cut with a driving style that’s similar to Stone Sour’s Mainstream Rock Songs No. 1s 'Say You'll Haunt Me' (2010) and Tired' (2014)." Despite the more radio-friendly sound, frontman Corey Taylor states that the song does not feature any auto-tune or pitch-correction. Despite the song's title, it is actually the fifth track on its respective album, and has no relation thematically to the similarly named "Song 2" from Blur.

Lyrically, Taylor described it as a love song, stating:

Track listing

Personnel 
Corey Taylor – lead vocals, rhythm guitar
Christian Martucci – lead guitar, backing vocals
Josh Rand – rhythm guitar
Johny Chow – bass
Roy Mayorga – drums

Charts

Weekly charts

Year-end charts

Certifications

References 

Stone Sour songs
2017 songs
2017 singles
Roadrunner Records singles
Songs written by Corey Taylor